Wang Yun (Chinese:王赟; March 28, 1983) is a retired Chinese football player.

Club career
As a very promising youngster Wang Yun would be bought by Shanghai COSCO Huili (the previous name of Shaanxi Chanba) for 5,000,000 RMB, making him one of the most expensive youngsters in Chinese history. Wang Yun would quickly show why the team paid such a price for him when he would go on to begin his professional career with them in the 2002 league season and  quickly established himself within the squad by playing in 22 league games and scoring 5 goals. When the club started to acquire several high profile Chinese internationals within the team Wang Yun was not only able to keep his place within the team but also establish himself as an integral member within the team that came runners-up in the 2003 Chinese Jia-A League season. When the club decided to move to away from Shanghai and towards Xi'an he would join them where he has remained with the club throughout his career and has continued to establish himself as regular until Milorad Kosanović was introduced as the club's manager during the 2010 league season and Wang Yun saw his playing time reduced.

Before the start of the 2011 Chinese Super League season Wang Yun would decide to leave his previous club and transfer to Dalian Shide. He would then go on to make his debut for the club in the first game of the season against Guangzhou Evergrande on April 2, 2011 in a 1-0 defeat where he came on as a substitute for Yan Song.

In December 2014, Wang transferred to fellow Chinese Super League side Shanghai Shenhua. On 1 July 2017, Wang was loaned to League One club Shanghai Shenxin until 31 December 2017.

On 28 February 2019, Shanghai Shenhua announced Wang's retirement and turned as the assistant coach of the club.

International career
Wang Yun made his only international appearance June 7, 2006 in a friendly against France, when he came on as a late substitute for Hao Junmin and scored an own goal in a 3–1 defeat.

Career statistics 
Statistics accurate as of match played 20 May 2018

References

External links

Player stats at Sohu.com

1983 births
Living people
Chinese footballers
Footballers from Shanghai
China international footballers
Beijing Renhe F.C. players
Dalian Shide F.C. players
Shanghai Shenxin F.C. players
Shanghai Shenhua F.C. players
Chinese Super League players
Association football midfielders
Shanghai Shenhua F.C. non-playing staff
Association football coaches